Celabrasion is the debut album by American rock band Sleeper Agent.  The album was produced by Jay Joyce and released digitally on iTunes on August 2, 2011 via Mom + Pop Music and physically on September 27, 2011.

Singles 
The first single from the album "Get It Daddy" was released as iTunes "Free Single of the Week" on April 26, 2011.  The song has been licensed for use in various promotions and campaigns.  The second single, "Get Burned," was released on January 17, 2012.

Track listing

Personnel

Sleeper Agent 
 Alex Kandel - vocals
 Tony Smith - guitar/vocals
 Justin Wilson - drums
 Scott Gardner - keys/synths
 Lee Williams - Bass (guitar)
 Josh Martin - lead guitar

Additional performances 
 Zach Lindsey - bass (on tracks 1-4, 6-10)
 Jay Joyce - piano

Technical personnel 
 Jay Joyce – Producer
 Jason Hall – Engineer
 Matt Wheeler - Assistant engineer
 Matt Agoglia – Mastering

References 

2011 debut albums
Albums produced by Jay Joyce
Mom + Pop Music albums